The sport of football in the country of Laos is run by the Lao Football Federation. The association administers the Laos national football team as well as the Lao Premier League. The league below is the Lao Division 1 League. Laos has been a member of FIFA since 1952. Football is the most popular sport in the country.

Laos football venues

References